On 21 March 2022 during the battle of Sumy, a Russian airstrike damaged one of the ammonia tanks at the Sumykhimprom plant, contaminating land within a  radius including the villages of Novoselytsya and Verkhnya Syrovatka. Due to the direction of the wind, the city of Sumy was largely unaffected despite its proximity to the leak.

Background 
Two days prior to the leak Mikhail Mizintsev, the Chief of Russia's National Defense Management Center claimed that Ukrainian nationalists were plotting a false flag chemical attack in Sumy. Mizintsev alleged on 19 March that mines had been placed in chemical storage facilities at the plant to poison residents in case of Russian troops advancement into the city. He also alleged that a secondary school was similarly sabotaged in Kotlyarovo, Mykolaiv Oblast.

Leak 
The leak was first reported at about 4:30 am local time on 21 March 2022 at the Sumykhimprom chemical plant, located in the suburbs of Sumy.

References

Ammonia
March 2022 events in Ukraine
Battle of Sumy
Northeastern Ukraine campaign
Disasters in Ukraine
Chemical disasters
2022 disasters in Ukraine
Airstrikes during the 2022 Russian invasion of Ukraine
Airstrikes conducted by Russia